Großer Traithen is a mountain of Bavaria, Germany.  It is part of the Eastern Alps. 

Mountains of Bavaria
One-thousanders of Germany
Mountains of the Alps